Mohammed Fawzi Johar Farag Abdulla (born 22 February 1990) is an Emirati association football player who plays for Al Nasr. He appeared at the 2012 Summer Olympics.

Career statistics

Club

1Continental competitions include the AFC Champions League
2Other tournaments include the UAE President Cup and Etisalat Emirates Cup

National team

As of 27 September 2009

Honours
United Arab Emirates
 Gulf Cup of Nations: 2013
 AFC Asian Cup third-place: 2015
AFC U-19 Championship: 2008

References

External links
 
 
 

1990 births
Living people
Emirati footballers
Al-Ittihad Kalba SC players
Al Ahli Club (Dubai) players
Baniyas Club players
Al Ain FC players
Al Jazira Club players
Al-Nasr SC (Dubai) players
Footballers at the 2012 Summer Olympics
Olympic footballers of the United Arab Emirates
UAE First Division League players
UAE Pro League players
Asian Games medalists in football
Footballers at the 2010 Asian Games
Asian Games silver medalists for the United Arab Emirates
Association football defenders
Medalists at the 2010 Asian Games
United Arab Emirates youth international footballers